Franz Leitner may refer to:

 Franz Leitner (politician) (1918–2005), Austrian politician
 Franz Leitner (speedway rider) (born 1968), former Austrian motorcycle speedway rider